The list of ship commissionings in 1863 includes a chronological list of all ships commissioned in 1863.


References

See also 

1863
 Ship commissionings